La Patrie dal Friûl (in English The Homeland of Friuli) is a Friulian monthly newspaper published in Gemona del Friuli, Italy.  It is one of the few newspapers in Friulian language.

Friulian-language mass media
Newspapers published in Italy